376th may refer to:

376th Air Expeditionary Wing, inactive wing of the United States Air Force, last stationed at the Transit Center at Manas International Airport, Kyrgyz Republic
376th Air Refueling Squadron, inactive United States Air Force unit
376th Expeditionary Operations Group, provisional United States Air Force Air Combat Command unit
376th Fighter Squadron, inactive United States Air Force unit
376th Parachute Field Artillery Battalion (376th PFAB), inactive airborne field artillery battalion of the United States Army
376th Troop Carrier Squadron, inactive United States Air Force unit

See also
376 (number)
376, the year 376 (CCCLXXVI) of the Julian calendar
376 BC